Carabus lineatus salmantitus is a subspecies of beetle in the family Carabidae that is endemic to Spain.

References

lineatus salmantitus
Beetles described in 1922
Taxa named by Ignacio Bolívar